Chilean Footballer of the Year is an award that the Circulo de Periodistas de Chile annually grants, to those Chilean soccer players who during the season of Primera División de Chile have obtained the greater number of points, in agreement with the opinion of the editors of the agency.

Chilean Footballer of the Year

Statistics by Club
 Colo-Colo: 9 times
 Universidad Católica: 7 times
 Universidad de Chile: 6 times
 Cobreloa: 5 times
 Audax Italiano, Cobresal, Palestino, Real Sociedad, Santiago Wanderers, Unión Española: 1 time

See also 
 Player of the Year of Argentina
 Paraguayan Footballer of the Year
 Footballer of the Year (disambiguation)

References

External links 
 Chile - Player of the Year at RSSSF.

Association football player of the year awards by nationality
Football in Chile
Chilean awards
Annual events in Chile